

The Deutscher Spielepreis (German Game Prize) is an important award for boardgames. It was started in 1990 by the German magazine Die Pöppel-Revue, which collects votes from the industry's  stores, magazines, professionals and game clubs. The results are announced every October at the Spiel game fair in Essen, Germany. The Essen Feather is awarded at the same ceremony.

In contrast to the Spiel des Jahres, which tends to be awarded to family games, the DSP is awarded for "gamers' games" with particularly good or innovative gameplay. Although at one point it was not uncommon for the DSP and the SdJ to be awarded to the same game (as was the case for The Settlers of Catan, El Grande, and Tikal in the 1990s), since Carcassonne (2001) only two games have succeeded in winning both awards: Dominion in 2009 and Azul in 2018.

Winners

1990 - 1991 - 1992 - 1993 - 1994 - 1995 - 1996 - 1997 - 1998 - 1999 - 2000 - 2001 - 2002 - 2003 - 2004 - 2005 - 2006 - 2007 - 2008 - 2009 - 2010 - 2011 - 2012 - 2013 - 2014 - 2015 - 2016 - 2017 - 2018 - 2019 - 2020 - 2021 - 2022

1990
1st: Hoity Toity (German: Adel Verpflichtet)
2nd: À la carte
3rd: Such a Thing? (German: Ein solches Ding)
4th: Favoriten
5th: Gold Digger (German: Goldrausch)
6th: Holiday AG
7th: Römer
8th: Wind & Wetter
9th: Timberland
10th: Dicke Kartoffeln

1991
1st: Master Labyrinth
2nd: Bauernschlau
3rd: Wacky Wacky West (German: Drunter und Drüber)
4th: Jagd der Vampire
5th: Conspiracy (German: Casablanca)
6th: Girl Talk
7th: Chameleon
8th: Duftende Spuren
9th: Flusspiraten
10th: Columbus

1992
1st: Flying Dutchman (German: der Fliegende Holländer)
2nd: Um Reifenbreite
3rd: Quo Vadis
4th: Tal der Könige
5th: Schraumeln
6th: Cosmic Encounter
7th: Minos
8th: Extrablatt
9th: Razzia
10th: Neolithibum
Best Children's Game: Schweinsgalopp

1993
1st: Modern Art
2nd: Tutankhamen (German: Tutanchamun)
3rd: Vernissage
4th: Bluff
5th: Acquire
6th: Highlanders (German: Rheingold)
7th: Spiel der Türme
8th: Sticheln
9th: History of the World
10th: Pfusch
Best Children's Game: Verflixt Gemixt

1994
1st: 6 nimmt!
2nd: The Mob (German: Capone)
3rd: Manhattan
4th: Intrigue
5th: Lifeboats (German: Rette Sich wer Kann)
6th: Was Sticht?
7th: Auf Heller und Pfennig
8th: Knock Out
9th: Take It Easy
10th: Billabong
Best Children's Game: Husch Husch kleine Hexe
Best Action Game: Loopin' Louie

1995
1st: The Settlers of Catan
2nd: Streetcar (German: Linie 1)
3rd: Sternen Himmel
4th: Mole in the Hole (German: Die Maulwurf Company)
5th: Medici
6th: Galopp Royal
7th: Buzzle
8th: Hattrick
9th: Set!
10th: High Society
Best Children's Game: Piepmatz

1996
1st: El Grande
2nd: Entdecker
3rd: Carabande
4th: Mü & More (German: Mü & mehr)
5th: Get the Goods (German: Reibach & Co.)
6th: MarraCash
7th: Yucata'
8th: Campanile
9th: Ab Die Post!
10th: Top Race
Best Children's Game: Hallo Dachs!

1997
1st: Löwenherz
2nd: The Settlers of Catan: The Card game (German: Die Siedler von Catan: Das Kartenspiel)
3rd: Showmanager
4th: Mississippi Queen
5th: Bohnanza
6th: Serenissima
7th: Ramses II (German: Der Zerstreute Pharao)
8th: Terra X (German: Expedition)
9th: Beim Zeus
10th: Manitou
Best Children's Game: Die Ritter von der Haselnuß

1998
1st: Tigris & Euphrates (German: Euphrat und Tigris)
2nd: Primordial Soup (German: Ursuppe)
3rd: Elfenland
4th: Through the Desert (German: Durch die Wüste)
5th: Canyon
6th: Basari
7th: Tycoon
8th: Caesar & Cleopatra
9th: Die Macher
10th: Freebooter (German: Freibeuter)
Best Children's Game: Chicken Cha Cha Cha (German: Zicke Zacke Hühnerkacke)

1999
1st: Tikal
2nd: Ra
3rd: Union Pacific
4th: Samurai
5th: Die Händler
6th: Giganten
7th: Verräter
8th: Mamma Mia!
9th: Chinatown
10th: Medieval Merchant (German: Pfeffersäcke)

2000
1st: Taj Mahal (German: Tadsch Mahal)
2nd: Torres
3rd: Princes of Florence (German: Die Fürsten von Florenz )
4th: La Città
5th: Vinci
6th: Citadels (German: Ohne Furcht und Adel)
7th: Carolus Magnus
8th: Web of Power (German: Kardinal & König)
9th: Aladdin's Dragons (German: Morgenland)
10th: Frank's Zoo (German: Zoff im Zoo)

2001
1st: Carcassonne
2nd: Medina
3rd: Traders of Genoa (German: Die Händler von Genua)
4th: Evo
5th: Capitol
6th: Cartagena
7th: San Marco
8th: Babel
9th: Java
10th: Das Amulett

2002
1st: Puerto Rico
2nd: TransAmerica
3rd: Dschunke
4th: Villa Paletti
5th: Mexica
6th: Nautilus
7th: Goldland
8th: Pueblo
9th: Pirate's Cove
10th: Pizarro & Co. (German: Magellan)

2003
1st: Amun Re
2nd: Alhambra
3rd: Clans
4th: Paris Paris
5th: Domaine
6th: Fische Fluppen Frikadellen
7th: Mare Nostrum
8th: New England
9th: Coloretto
10th: Edel, Stein & Reich

2004
1st: Saint Petersburg (German: Sankt Petersburg)
2nd: San Juan
3rd: Goa
4th: Attika
5th: Ingenious (German: Einfach Genial)
6th: Ticket to Ride (German: Zug um Zug)
7th: Maharaja
8th: Fearsome Floors (German: Finstere Flure)
9th: Hansa
10th: The Bridges of Shangri-La (German: Die Brücken von Shangri-La)

2005
1st: Louis XIV
2nd: Niagara
3rd: Manila
4th: Ubongo
5th: Himalaya
6th: Around the World in 80 Days (German: In 80 Tagen um die Welt)
7th: Shadows over Camelot (German: Schatten über Camelot)
8th: Jambo
9th: Das Zepter von Zavandor
10th: Verflixxt

2006
1st: Caylus
2nd: Thurn and Taxis
3rd: Antike
4th: Blue Moon City
5th: Mesopotamia (German: Mesopotamien)
6th: Elasund: The First City
7th: Mauerbauer
8th: Hacienda
9th: Augsburg 1520
10th: Rum & Pirates (German: Um Ru(h)m & Ehre)

The prizes for Best Children's Game and Best Rules were both won by Nacht der Magier.

2007
1st: The Pillars of the Earth (German: Die Säulen der Erde)
2nd: Notre Dame
3rd: Vikings (German: Wikinger)
4th: Yspahan
5th: Zooloretto
6th: Arkadia (German: Die Baumeister von Arkadia)
7th: Imperial
8th: Leonardo da Vinci (German: Maestro Leonardo)
9th: Thebes (German: Jenseits von Theben)
10th: Colosseum

2008
1st: Agricola
2nd: Stone Age
3rd: Cuba
4th: In the Year of the Dragon (German: Im Jahr des Drachen)
5th: Tribune: Primus Inter Pares
6th: Hamburgum
7th: Galaxy Trucker
8th: Keltis
9th: Witch's Brew (German: Wie verhext!)
10th: Metropolys

2009
1st: Dominion
2nd: Le Havre
3rd: Pandemic
4th: Finca
5th: Small World
6th: Valdora
7th: Diamonds Club
8th: Through the Ages (German: Im Wander der Zeiten)
9th: Sherwood Forest
10th: Fauna

2010
1st: Fresco
2nd: Vasco da Gama
3rd: World Without End (German: Die Tore der Welt)
4th: Tobago
5th: Hansa Teutonica
6th: Endeavor (German: Magister Navis)
7th: Egizia
8th: Macao
9th: Dungeon Lords
10th: Power Struggle (German: Machtspiele)

2011
1st: 7 Wonders
2nd: The Castles of Burgundy (German: Die Burgen von Burgund)
3rd: Troyes
4th: Navegador
5th: Asara
6th: Mondo
7th: Pantheon
8th: Lancaster
9th: Luna
10th: Strasbourg

2012
1st: Village
2nd: Trajan
3rd: Hawaii
4th: Ora Et Labora
5th: Helvetia
6th: Targi
7th: Kingdom Builder
8th: Vegas
9th: Africana
10th: Santa Cruz

2013
1st: Terra Mystica
2nd: Tzolk'in: The Mayan Calendar (German: Tzolk'in: Der Maya Kalender)
3rd: Brugge (German: Brügge)
4th: Bora Bora
5th: Legends of Andor (German: Die Legenden von Andor)
6th: Hanabi
7th: Yedo
8th: Keyflower
9th: Rialto
10th: Augustus

2014
1st: Russian Railroads
2nd: Istanbul
3rd: Concordia
4th: Love Letter
5th: Camel Up
6th: Caverna: The Cave Farmers (German: Caverna: Die Höhlenbauern)
7th: Lewis & Clark
8th: Rococo (German: Rokoko)
9th: Glass Road (German: Die Glasstraße)
10th: Splendor
Best Children's Game: Feuerdrachen

2015
1st: The Voyages of Marco Polo (German: Auf den Spuren von Marco Polo)
2nd: Orléans
3rd: Colt Express
4th: Murano
5th: Fields of Arle (German: Arler Erde)
6th: Five Tribes
7th: Cacao
8th: Machi Koro
9th: Aquasphere
10th: Patchwork
Best Children's Game: Spinderella

2016
1st: Mombasa
2nd: Codenames
3rd: T.I.M.E. Stories
4th: Pandemic Legacy: Season 1
5th: Mysterium
6th: Karuba
7th: Isle of Skye: From Chieftain to King
8th: Imhotep
9th: 7 Wonders: Duel
10th: Nippon
Best Children's Game: Leo muss zum Friseur

2017
1st: Terraforming Mars
2nd: Great Western Trail
3rd: A Feast for Odin (Ein Fest für Odin)
4th: Scythe
5th: First Class
6th: Kingdomino
6th: Raiders of the North Sea (Räuber der Nordsee)
7th: Fabled Fruit (Fabelsaft)
8th: Captain Sonar
9th: Magic Maze
10th: The Quest for El Dorado (Wettlauf nach El Dorado)
Best Children's Game: Icecool

2018
1st: Azul
2nd: Gaia Project
3rd: Rajas of the Ganges
4th: Clans of Caledonia
5th: Heaven & Ale
6th: Pandemic Legacy: Season 2
7th: Clank!
8th: The Quacks of Quedlinburg (Die Quacksalber von Quedlinburg)
9th: The Mind
10th: Altiplano
Best Children's Game: Memoarrr!

2019
1st: Wingspan
2nd: The Taverns of Tiefenthal
3rd: Teotihuacan
4th: Spirit Island
5th: Architects of the West Kingdom
6th: Detective
7th: Underwater Cities
8th: Newton
9th: Just One
10th: Gloomhaven
Best Children's Game: Concept Kids: Animals

2020
1st: The Crew
2nd: Cartographers
3rd: Maracaibo
4th: Barrage
5th: Cooper Island
6th: Glen More II: Chronicles
7th: Crystal Palace
8th: Parks
9th: Marco Polo II: In the Service of the Khan
10th: Paladins of the West Kingdom
Best Children's Game: Andor Junior

2021
1st: Lost Ruins of Arnak
2nd: MicroMacro: Crime City
3rd: The Adventures of Robin Hood
4th: Paleo
5th: Aeon's End
6th: Everdell
7th: Fantasy Realms
8th: Anno 1800
9th: Praga Caput Regni
10th: Gloomhaven: The Jaws of the Lion
Best Children's Game: Dodo

2022
1st: Ark Nova
2nd: Cascadia
3rd: Dune: Imperium
4th: Living Forest
5th: The Red Cathedral
6th: Witchstone
7th: Beyond the Sun
8th: Scout
9th: Golem
10th: Terraforming Mars: Ares Expedition

See also
 Spiel des Jahres
 Origins Award
 MinD-Spielepreis

References

External links
 Deutscher Spiele Preis home page

Board game awards
 
German awards
Awards established in 1990